The FIBA Women's Asia Cup is an international basketball tournament which takes place every two years for women's national teams from FIBA Asia, and since 2017 FIBA Oceania. It was known as the Asian Basketball Confederation (ABC) Championship until 2001, and the FIBA Asia Women's Championship until 2015.

Summary

Medal table

Tournament awards
Most recent award winners (2021)

Participating nations

General statistics
All-time records, as of the 2021 FIBA Women's Asia Cup (Divisions A and B). Results of the teams participating in Division B of the tournament are also included.

See also
 Basketball at the Asian Games
 FIBA Asia Cup for Men
 FIBA Asia Under-20 Championship for Women
 FIBA Asia Under-18 Championship for Women
 FIBA Asia Under-16 Championship for Women

References

External links
FIBA Asia official website
FIBA Oceania official website
Tournament history at FIBA.com

 
    
Basketball
1965 establishments in Asia
Recurring sporting events established in 1965